is an Echizen Railway Katsuyama Eiheiji Line railway station located in the city of Fukui, Fukui Prefecture, Japan.

Lines

Station layout
The station consists of one island platform connected to the station building by a level crossing. The station is unattended.

Adjacent stations

History
The station was opened on May 13, 1915. Operations were halted from June 25, 2001. The station reopened on July 20, 2003 as an Echizen Railway station.

Surrounding area
To the north of the station is an industrial park; to the south, homes and rice fields.
  passes to the south.

See also
 List of railway stations in Japan

External links

  

Railway stations in Fukui Prefecture
Railway stations in Japan opened in 1915
Katsuyama Eiheiji Line
Fukui (city)